H. exigua may refer to:

 Haematobia exigua, a true fly
 Haliotis exigua, an ear shell
 Haminoea exigua, a bubble snail
 Herviella exigua, a sea slug
 Hogna exigua, a wolf spider
 Hydractinia exigua, an athecate hydroid